Tampere Central Library (Finnish: Tampereen kaupungin pääkirjasto) is the main municipal library in Tampere, Finland. It is also known as Metso ('Capercaillie'), due to its resemblance to the bird, when viewed from above. The library is located along the Hämeenpuisto boulevard in the city centre.

Facilities
In addition to the main lending collection, the library houses a reference section and information service, children's and young adults' sections, newspaper reading room, music section as well as a small performance stage. There are also meeting, project work and exhibition spaces, public computer terminals, as well as a cafeteria, Cafe Metso. The facilities are laid out over three floors.

For a quarter of a century, the building was also home to the city's Moomin Museum, until its move to new premises in 2012.

Building

The library was designed by architects Reima and Raili Pietilä in the organic architecture style. The design contest was held in 1978, with the Pietiläs' proposal Soidinmenot ('Lek mating') winning by unanimous decision. Inspired by the architects' visit to Ireland during the initial ideas phase, their design language was influenced by Celtic patterns, animal shapes and glacial formations.

The building exterior is made of granite, wiborgite, copper and glass.

Construction began in 1983, and the library opened to the public in August 1986.

A comprehensive renovation was carried out in 2015-2017, at a cost of over €11 million, to refurbish the facilities and bring them better in line with modern requirements.

Gallery

See also

 Helsinki Central Library Oodi

References

Further reading
Short article on the building's architecture

External links
 (in Finnish)

Libraries in Finland
Buildings and structures in Tampere
Modernist architecture in Finland
Organic architecture
Library buildings completed in 1986
Libraries established in 1986